Allain is both a surname and a given name. Notable people with the name include:

Surname
Alexander Allain (1920–1994), American lawyer and library advocate
Keith Allain (born 1958), American ice hockey player and coach
Marcel Allain (1885–1969), French writer
Pierre Allain (1904–2000), French mountain climber
Rhett Allain, American physicist
Raymonde Allain (1912–2008), French model and actress
Rick Allain (born 1969), Canadian ice hockey player and coach
Stephanie Allain (born 1959), American film producer
Tara Allain (born 1985), American beauty pageant winner
Theophile T. Allain (1846–1917), American politician
Valérie Allain (born 1966), French actress
William Allain (1928–2013), American politician

Given name
Allain Gaussin (born 1943), French composer
Allain Provost, French landscape architect
Allain Roy (born 1970), Canadian ice hockey player
Allain Tikko (1979–2009), Estonian military officer

See also
Alain (disambiguation)

French masculine given names
French-language surnames
Surnames of French origin